Hemispheres is the first solo album by American hip hop artist Doseone, released in 1998.

Track listing

References

External links
 
 

1998 debut albums
Doseone albums
Albums produced by J. Rawls
Albums produced by Jel (music producer)